William P. Delany (1855 – 7 March 1916) was an Irish Member of Parliament (MP) representing Queen's County Ossory, from 1900 to 1916. He was one of the founders of the United Irish League.

References

External links 
 

1855 births
1916 deaths
UK MPs 1900–1906
UK MPs 1906–1910
UK MPs 1910
UK MPs 1910–1918
Members of the Parliament of the United Kingdom for Queen's County constituencies (1801–1922)